Lift accessed mountain biking or Mountain bike park is a summer activity that is spreading all over the world. Using the chairlifts or gondola lifts at a ski area, mountain bikers can get up to higher altitudes quickly. The bikers don't have to ride up, and the ski area operators can keep the hill more profitable during the summer. Most bike parks have a mix of dirtjumping, downhill, enduro and freeride terrain on the trails.

Many ski resorts have embraced the sport, opening the chairlifts and building trails to rider in the summer. Lift-accessed bike parks are good because they offer the chance to make many more runs down a mountain than could be done without use of a lift.

Canada

Whistler-Blackcomb- Whistler, British Columbia 
Sun Peaks Resort- Kamloops, British Columbia 
Panorama Mountain Village- Invermere, British Columbia 
Fernie Alpine Resort- Fernie, British Columbia 
Kicking Horse Mountain Resort- Golden, British Columbia 
Mount Washington Alpine Resort- Comox, British Columbia (closed MTB operations down in 2013)
Silver Star Mountain Resort- Vernon, British Columbia 
Blue Mountain- Collingwood, Ontario 
Horseshoe Resort- Horseshoe Valley, Ontario 
Mont Tremblant- Mont Tremblant, Quebec 
Mont Sainte-Anne- Quebec
Mont Brome- Bromont, Quebec
Camp Fortune- Chelsea, Quebec
Canada Olympic Park- Calgary, Alberta
Rabbit Hill-Edmonton, Alberta (closed summer operations down in 2011)
Sugarloaf Provincial Park- Campbellton, New Brunswick

France

 Tignes, Savoie department
 Lac Blanc (Vosges), Alsace

Finland

 Levi
 Sappeen hiihtokeskus
 Kalpalinna
 Vuokatti

Italy 
 Mottolino Fun Mountain, Livigno

Norway

 Hafjell

Romania

 Bușteni
 Sinaia
 Azuga

United States
Mammoth Mountain Ski Area- Mammoth Lakes, California
Northstar at Tahoe- Truckee, California
Kirkwood Mountain Resort- Kirkwood, California
Angel Fire Resort- New Mexico
Mount Hood Skibowl- Government Camp, Oregon
Brian Head Resort- Parowan, Utah
Snowbasin- Ogden, Utah
Snowbird-Salt Lake City, Utah
Solitude Mountain Resort-Salt Lake City, Utah
Sugarloaf Mountain-Carrabassett Valley, Maine
Sundance-Provo, Utah
Park City Mountain Resort- Park City, Utah
Deer Valley Resort-Park City, Utah
The Canyons-Park City, Utah
Plattekill Mountain- Roxbury, New York
Vail Mountain- Vail, Colorado
Killington Ski Resort- Killington, Vermont
Waterville Valley Resort- Waterville Valley, New Hampshire
Marquette Mountain- Marquette, Michigan
Bryce Resort- Virginia
Attitash Bear Peak-Bartlett, New Hampshire
Whitefish Mountain Resort-Whitefish, Montana
Keystone Resort-Dillon, Colorado
Sunrise Park Resort-Greer, Arizona
Seven Springs Mountain Resort-Champion, Pennsylvania
Sunday River-Maine
Alyeska Resort-Girdwood, Alaska
Stevens Pass-Skykomish, Washington
Pajarito-Los Alamos, New Mexico
Blue Mountain-Palmerton, Pennsylvania
Mount Snow-West Dover, Vermont

Scotland

 Nevis Range, Fort William
Glencoe Mountain, Argyll

References

External links 
 Map of mountain bike parks around the world

Mountain biking